Eterno  is the first album by Romanthica. The album was self-released twice in 2012 and 2013, then re-released in 2014 under the sub-label Fair Warning / Gran Sol. The track Despierta features ex-Leaves' Eyes member Liv Kristine. A digital download single of Mercurio was released in 2013.

Music video
Two music videos were released from the album, the first was Mercurio released on Sep 1, 2013 and Muriel released on May 14, 2014, both directed and produced by Xavi Díaz from Nova Era Produccions.

Track listing

Personnel
Taken from the album's booklet:
David Gohe – songwriting
Mats Limpan – mastering
David Castillo – recording, producer
Alexander Krull – recording, producer (track 11)

References

2012 debut albums